Andaz-e-Sitam (The Act Of Cruelty) was a Pakistani drama television series directed by Ali Hassan, written by Inam Hasan. It originally aired on Urdu 1 from 5 January 2017 to 8 June 2017. Kubra Khan played the lead role.

Plot
Andaz-e-Sitam is a story of a confident, bold and blunt girl named Ayaat, who returns from the US during a semester break. When she returns home she encounters her younger brother's college friend, Wamiq, who is an arrogant, spoiled brat.

At one point, Wamiq makes moves on her causing Ayaat to slap him and resulting in being kidnapped for revenge. While in his custody, Wamiq offers her the opportunity to marry him, maintaining that she will be raped wither way. She hesitantly agrees to the marriage. After the wedding, and subsequent marital rape, however, he burns the marriage papers. He then threatens the man who read their Nikaah (thus, wedding them) to stay silent, leaving Ayaat with no evidence of their marriage.

Meanwhile, the police suspect Salman, Ayaat's admirer, of her kidnapping. When She returns home, however, Ayaat tells her side of the story and Salman is released.  Soon after, the family finds out that Ayaat is pregnant with Wamiq's child. Ayaat goes to court and fights for justice, however, loses the case. Afterwards, Wamiq admires her confidence and holds a press conference confessing to all his crimes, accepting to be the father of her unborn child and proposes to her.

Wamiq's mother, an influential social worker who runs an NGO, sweeps the incident under the rug and requests Ayaat to marry him in order to preserve their honor. Ayaat refuses and instead pursues a divorce. This leads to Ayaat's father dying from lament. Following a series of emotional events, she maintains that she will not marry him and will never forgive him for what he did.

Meanwhile, a love blossoms between Ayaat and Salaman and they marry. She soon gets pregnant with Salman's child. Wamiq kidnaps Ayaat again, as well as their son, and forces her to divorce Salaman. Salaman, however, arrives at the scene and shoots Wamiq, saving his lover and his marriage. Ayaat and Salaman then live happily every after with their two children.

Cast
Kubra Khan as Aayat
Agha Ali as Wamik
Faris Shafi as Salman
Ali Ansari as Samar
Irsa Ghazal as Begum Nawazish
Manzoor Qureshi as Mirza Ahmed 
Janita Asma
Shaista Jabeen
Mehwish Qureshi
Sabiha Hashmi
other

References

2016 Pakistani television series debuts
Pakistani drama television series
2017 Pakistani television series endings
Urdu 1 original programming
Urdu 1